Pleurodiscus is a genus of air-breathing land snails, terrestrial pulmonate gastropod mollusks in the superfamily Pupilloidea.

Pleurodiscus is the only genus in the family Pleurodiscidae.

Species
Species within the genus Pleurodiscus include:
 Pleurodiscus balmei (Potiez & Michaud, 1835) - the type species of the genus
 Pleurodiscus astericus Bank & Menkhorst, 1991
 Pleurodiscus cyprius (Kobelt, 1896)
 Pleurodiscus sudensis	(Pfeiffer, 1846)

References

External links 

 of shells

Pleurodiscidae